Sidetrip Travel Magazine is a free quarterly travel magazine that features destinations in the Philippines. It is noticeably smaller than mainstream and travel magazines, measuring 4.75 in. x 8.5 in. only. Sidetrip is distributed at the Department of Tourism Information Center (T.M. Kalaw, Manila), Victory Liner terminals (for deluxe passengers), travel agencies, and select cafes and restaurants in Metro Manila. It is published by Pico Integrated Marketing Agency.

History 
Sidetrip began as the onboard magazine of Victory Liner, one of the oldest and biggest bus transit companies operating in North Luzon. Its maiden issue came out in December 2007 and was presented as the bimonthly (once every two months) alternative travel guide to northern Philippines. However, it was only after three issues before the magazine was formally presented to the press during its official launch party held on April 24, 2008, at Eastwood City, Libis, Quezon City.

The first issue featured tourist attractions of Baguio, the country's summer capital and trade capital of Cordillera Administrative Region. Also included were tourism activities such as ukay-ukay (sidewalk vendors selling second-hand clothes, bags, and other items), along with short but informative features and directory listing of Baguio's hotels, resorts and art-inspired restaurants.

The second issue, the Pampanga issue was released in February 2008 and focused on Pampanga's cuisine, deemed to be the best in the Philippines. Notable features were the exotic fare such as camaru and halo-halo, one of Filipino's favorite summer treat and dessert which literally translates to "mixed-mixed" and is made with sweetened fruits, yam, leche flan, milk and shaved ice. More importantly, it gave a rundown of Pampanga's best restaurants. Sidetrip also further delved into history and culture, with articles on Pampanga's prehispanic or pre-Spanish) history.

In its third issue, Sidetrip introduced several changes in its look and content. From a bimonthly magazine, Sidetrip changed its frequency to quarterly (April to June). It also noticeably improved its content by including brief and informative travel stories and a fashion section. The hotel and directory listing too was given a face lift, with its new reader-friendly reviews and layout. But the best improvement would be its map, a detailed adventure map to Zambales, complete with hotel and attraction listings, restaurants, bus stations and gasoline stations.

Conquer Philippines Adventure Race 
In celebration of travel, adventure and sports, Sidetrip organized an annual adventure race series that aims to bring together travelers and adventurers together to experience the unique sights and culture of a chosen venue.

For its debut, Conquer Philippines brings 100 teams of two to the beautiful coastal province of Zambales with Conquer Zambales: The Sidetrip Adventure Race.

1. Conquer Zambales.
Conquer Zambales: The Sidetrip Adventure Race is an exciting two-day race that will take 100 teams of two across the breathtaking and rugged terrains of Zambales. Teams of two shall complete various tasks to get a chance to win a total of P300,000 cash and prizes.

Prizes
1st prize - P100,000 cash and products
2nd prize - P60,000 cash and products
3rd prize - P40,000 cash and products

The race is covered by three media outfits, Solar Sports, Living Asia and Dream Satellite TV.

Aside from the two-day race, Sidetrip is bringing The Dawn band to Zambales as a post-race treat for the Conquer Zambales Victory Party.

Magazine sections 

1. Wanderlust – Tales of travels across the Philippines

2. Tasty Travels – Includes food and restaurant reviews, recipes and

3. Arts and Culture – Features on the peoples and stories behind every destination

4. City Scenes - Rundown of the metro's hotspots and the places to dine, wine and unwind.

5. Road signs - Travel advisories, facts and Q&As

6. Escape - Reviews of hotels, resorts and other accommodation options

7. All for Raffle – Promos and raffle for the readers

Distribution points 

Primary International Airports
Diosdado Macapagal International Airport
Mactan-Cebu International Airport
Davao International Airport
Ninoy Aquino International Airport
Subic Bay International Airport

Secondary International Airports
General Santos Int'l Airport(Tambler Airport)
Iloilo International Airport
Laoag International Airport
Zamboanga International Airport
Major Commercial Domestic Airports
Baguio Airport
Dumaguete Airport
Legazpi Airport
Puerto Princesa Airport
Roxas Airport
Mc Guire Field (San Jose Airport)
Daniel Z. Romualdez Airport (Tacloban Airport)

Bus and shipping lines
Victory Liner DeLuxe Buses
Super Ferry (Cabins and staterooms)

Restaurants and Coffee shops
Fuzion Café Greenbelt, Makati
Fuzion Café, The Podium, Ortigas Center, Pasig
Fuzion Café, Promenade, Greenhills
Fuzion Café, SM The Block, Quezon City
Fuzion Café, SM Fairview, Quezon City
Fuzion Café, SM Baguio
Fuzion Café, Trinoma Mall, Quezon City
Select Coffee Shops and resto in Metro Manila

Bars
Bedspace, Greenbelt, Makati
Bedscene, Mall of Asia
Bedroom, Eastwood City, QC

Others
Select Travel Agencies
DOT Info Center, Ermita, Manila

Issues 

December 2007 - January 2008: Baguio (Summer Capital of the Philippines)

February 2008 - March 2008 : Pampanga (Culinary Capital of the Philippines)

April 2008 - June 2008: Zambales (Beach Capital of Luzon)

July 2008 - September 2008: Water special

External links 
 
 Sidetrip official multiply account - https://web.archive.org/web/20090427234644/http://sidetripmag.multiply.com/

Tourism magazines
Quarterly magazines
Magazines published in the Philippines
Magazines established in 2007